Chilpancingo is an underground metro station along Line 9 of the Mexico City Metro. It is located in the Cuauhtémoc borough of Mexico City. It is very close to Metrobús station of the same name. In 2019, the station had an average ridership of 49,122 passengers per day, making it the busiest station in Line 9 and the 17th busiest station in the network.

General information
The station is named after the nearby Avenida Chilpancingo, which in turn is named after the city of Chilpancingo de los Bravo, the capital of the state of Guerrero. The station logo is the silhouette of a wasp since Chilpancingo means the place of the wasps in Nahuatl. When Line 9 was in planning stage, the name of the station was Condesa, due to the neighborhood it serves, but it was finally changed to Chilpancingo.

The station serves the Colonia Roma Sur and Colonia Condesa neighbourhoods in the Cuauhtémoc borough.  It is located at the intersection of Avenida de los Insurgentes and Avenida Baja California.  It was opened on 29 August 1988.

In July 2007 a man in his 70s died of a heart attack within the station.

Ridership

See also
 UAM Cuajimalpa - the Avenida Baja California branch is near this station
 Secretariat of Agriculture, Livestock, Rural Development, Fisheries and Food - a satellite office is located a few blocks southwest of the station
 World Trade Center Mexico City - located several blocks southwest of the station

References

External links
 

Chilpancingo
Railway stations opened in 1988
1988 establishments in Mexico
Mexico City Metro stations in Cuauhtémoc, Mexico City
Accessible Mexico City Metro stations